HMS Rattler was the mercantile Hope that the Royal Navy purchased at Leith in 1797. It initially named her GB No.41, and then renamed her HMS Rattler. The Navy sold her in 1802. She returned to the name Hope and became a merchantman trading with Hamburg, Gibraltar, and lastly, Cowes. She was last listed in 1816.

Career
The Royal Navy commissioned Rattler in September 1797 under Lieutenant John Gibbs. He died, probably before but possibly after Lieutenant Samuel Wickham took command of Rattler in June 1798, for the North Sea. On 18 July 1801 she arrived at Elsinor, having escorted the Leith fleet. The Navy sold Rattler on 31 May 1802, shortly after the Peace of Amiens took effect.

Rattler returned to her original name, Hope, and first appeared in Lloyd's Register (LR) in 1802.

Fate
Hope was last listed in Lloyd's Register in 1816 with data unchanged since 1812.

Citations

References
 

1797 ships
Gunvessels of the Royal Navy
Age of Sail merchant ships of England